Mariela Jiménez Mirón (born 13 December 1997) is a Mexican footballer who plays as a forward for Liga MX Femenil side Club Universidad Nacional and the Mexico women's national team.

International career
Jiménez made her senior debut for Mexico on 11 March 2020 in a 0–0 friendly draw against the Czech Republic.

References

External links 
 

1997 births
Living people
Women's association football forwards
Mexican women's footballers
Footballers from Puebla
Mexico women's international footballers
Liga MX Femenil players
Club Puebla players
Club Universidad Nacional (women) footballers
20th-century Mexican women
21st-century Mexican women
Mexican footballers